Claire Booth may refer to:

 Claire Booth, wife of Alexander Windsor, Earl of Ulster
 Claire Booth (opera singer) (born ), British soprano opera singer